Water Music is the first novel by T. C. Boyle, first published in 1981. It is a semi-fictional historical adventure novel that is set in the late 18th and early 19th century.

Plot
The novel follows the parallel adventures and intertwining fates of its protagonists Ned Rise, a luckless petty criminal, and the famous explorer Mungo Park - the first a purely fictional character, the latter based on a historical person. The book takes place in various locales in Scotland, England and Western Africa. It revolves around  two Imperial British expeditions into the interior of Western Africa in an effort to find and explore the Niger River.

The novel is loosely based on historical sources, including Mungo Park's 1799 book, Travels in the Interior Districts of Africa. However, as Boyle admits in his foreword to Water Music, he does not claim historical accuracy or even faithfulness to the contemporary accounts, whose reliability is doubtful anyway.

Book information
Hardcover -  (1981, First edition) published by Little Brown
Paperback -  (1983) published by Penguin Books

References

External links
T. C. Boyle official website

1982 American novels
American historical novels
American adventure novels
English-language novels
Novels by T. C. Boyle
Little, Brown and Company books
1982 debut novels